HMS Portia was a 14-gun Crocus-class brig of the Royal Navy that was launched in 1810. The Navy sold her in 1817 for breaking up after an uneventful career.

Career
Commander Charles Warde was appointed to Banterer on 9 June 1810. He commissioned her for the North Sea.

Between 29 July and 4 August 1811,  captured several Dutch fishing boats: Gute Verwagting, Tobie Maria, Jonge Maria, Jeannette, Femme Elizabeth, Hoop (alias Esperance), and the Rondwich.

On 10 August 1811 Banterer recaptured Fortuna.

Commander Warde was promoted to post captain  on 18 September 1815.

Fate
The "Principal Officers and Commissioners of His Majesty's Navy" offered Banterer for sale on 30 January 1817 at Deptford. She finally sold on 6 March 1817 to Gordon & Co. for £850 for breaking up.

Notes, citations, & references
Notes

Citations

References
 
 

1810 ships
Brigs of the Royal Navy